The black noddy or white-capped noddy (Anous minutus) is a seabird from the family Laridae. It is a medium-sized species of tern with black plumage and a white cap. It closely resembles the lesser noddy (Anous tenuirostris) with which it was at one time considered conspecific. The black noddy has slightly darker plumage and dark rather than pale lores.

Taxonomy
The black noddy was first formally described by German naturalist and lawyer Friedrich Boie in 1844 under its current binomial name. The genus name Anous is ancient Greek for "stupid" or "foolish". The specific name minutus is the Latin for "small".

There are seven subspecies:
A. m. worcesteri (McGregor, 1911) – Cavilli Island and Tubbataha Reef (Sulu Sea)
A. m. minutus Boie, 1844 – northeast Australia and New Guinea to Tuamotu Archipelago
A. m. marcusi (Bryan, 1903) – Marcus and Wake Islands through Micronesia to the Caroline Islands
A. m. melanogenys Gray, 1846 – Hawaiian Islands
A. m. diamesus (Heller and Snodgrass, 1901) – Clipperton Island (off western Mexico) and Cocos Island (off western Costa Rica)
A. m. americanus (Mathews, 1912) – islands in the Caribbean Sea
A. m. atlanticus (Mathews, 1912) – tropical islands in the Atlantic

Description
It has dark plumage and a pale crown. There is a small white crescent under each eye and a white spot above. It has long tapering wings and a truncated tail. The sharply pointed bill is black. The feet are fully webbed and are black in most subspecies but orange in melanogenys.

Behaviour
These birds may have become known as "noddies" because of the behaviour of both sexes as they constantly dip their heads during their breeding display. They are very tolerant of humans even to the extent that they can be picked up off the nest. They feed on fish and squid which they gather by flying low over the surface of the sea and picking them up. They may associate with other seabirds in areas where predatory fish are driving small fish to the surface.

The nests of these birds consist of a level platform, often created in the branches of trees by a series of dried leaves covered with bird droppings.  One egg is laid each season, and nests are re-used in subsequent years. The trees used for this purpose are various but the Pisonia is most often used, and in large trees, there are often several nests. The guano produced by these birds adds large quantities of nutrients to the soil which is of great importance to the plant communities on coral islands.

Distribution
The black noddy has a worldwide distribution in tropical and subtropical seas, with colonies widespread in the Pacific Ocean and more scattered across the Caribbean, central Atlantic and in the northeast Indian Ocean. At sea it is usually seen close to its breeding colonies within 80 km of shore. Birds return to their colonies, or to other islands, to roost at night.

Cultural significance 
This is one of the landfinding birds whose daily foraging flights were traditionally employed by Pacific navigators to locate unseen atolls.

Gallery

References

 Guager, V.H. (1999) Black Noddy Anous minutus, in ''The Birds of North America, No412 (Poole, A. and Gill, F. eds) The Academy of Natural Sciences, Philadelphia, and The American Ornithologists’ Union, Washington, D.C.

External links 

 Midway atoll US Fish and Wildlife page on the black noddy.
 New Hampshire Public TV "Natureworks" page on the black noddy.
  USDA information

Anous
black noddy
Birds of Ascension Island
Birds of the Atlantic Ocean
Birds of the Pacific Ocean
Birds of the Gulf of Guinea
Birds of Hawaii
Birds of Puerto Rico
Birds of the Dominican Republic
Birds of Saint Helena Island
black noddy
black noddy
Articles containing video clips
Birds of Norfolk Island
Pantropical fauna